Bulbaeolidia alba is a species of sea slug, an aeolid nudibranch, a marine gastropod mollusc in the family Aeolidiidae.

Distribution
This species was described from New Caledonia. It has been reported from localities in the Central Indo-Pacific region to Réunion and Tanzania in the Indian Ocean.

References

External links
 

Aeolidiidae
Gastropods described in 1928